Emir Hadžić (born 19 July 1984) is a Bosnian retired professional footballer.

Club career
In the summer of 2009, Hadžić was transferred from Čelik Zenica, where he was captain in the Bosnian Premier League. He then decided to join Beta Ethniki club Panetolikos, where he spent the 2009–10 season. On 19 July 2010, Hadžić agreed to terminate his contract with Panetolikos and sign a two-year contract with Istra 1961. Unhappy with the playing time given at Istra, he moved back to Čelik in January 2011.

On 30 January 2012, Hadžić signed with Budapest Honvéd. He left the club in July of the same year. After Honved, Hadžić played for hometown club Sarajevo, Ironi Nir Ramat HaSharon, Hapoel Acre and Olimpik, where he finished his playing career at the age of 33.

International career
Hadžić played in an unofficial game against Poland in December 2007, but he made his official debut for Bosnia and Herzegovina in a June 2009 friendly match against Uzbekistan.

Managerial career
After finishing his playing career, Hadžić started working as a sporting director of Olimpik from June 2017 until May 2018. He was then the sports coordinator of Sarajevo from May 2018 to April 2021. Hadžić was reappointed as Sarajevo's sports coordinator in May 2022. He was released from his duty in November 2022.

Honours

Player
Budapest Honvéd 
Puskás Cup: 2012

Individual
Bosnian Premier League Top Goalscorer: 2012–13 (20 goals)

References

External links
FK Sarajevo

1984 births
Living people
People from Kakanj
Association football forwards
Bosnia and Herzegovina footballers
Bosnia and Herzegovina international footballers
FK Rudar Kakanj players
FK Željezničar Sarajevo players
NK Celje players
NK Čelik Zenica players
Panetolikos F.C. players
NK Istra 1961 players
Budapest Honvéd FC players
FK Sarajevo players
Hapoel Nir Ramat HaSharon F.C. players
Hapoel Acre F.C. players
FK Olimpik players
Premier League of Bosnia and Herzegovina players
Slovenian PrvaLiga players
Football League (Greece) players
Croatian Football League players
Nemzeti Bajnokság I players
Israeli Premier League players
Bosnia and Herzegovina expatriate footballers
Expatriate footballers in Slovenia
Expatriate footballers in Greece
Expatriate footballers in Croatia
Expatriate footballers in Hungary
Expatriate footballers in Israel
Bosnia and Herzegovina expatriate sportspeople in Slovenia
Bosnia and Herzegovina expatriate sportspeople in Greece
Bosnia and Herzegovina expatriate sportspeople in Croatia
Bosnia and Herzegovina expatriate sportspeople in Hungary
Bosnia and Herzegovina expatriate sportspeople in Israel